Bethany is an unincorporated community in York County, in the U.S. state of South Carolina.

History 
A post office called Bethany was established in 1851, and remained in operation until 1902. The community took its name from the local Bethany Associate Reformed Presbyterian Church.

References 

Unincorporated communities in South Carolina
Unincorporated communities in York County, South Carolina